Gabriel Glorieux (11 June 1930 – 20 August 2007) was a Belgian cyclist. He competed in two events at the 1952 Summer Olympics.

References

External links

1930 births
2007 deaths
Belgian male cyclists
Olympic cyclists of Belgium
Cyclists at the 1952 Summer Olympics
Walloon sportspeople
Cyclists from Hainaut (province)
People from Quévy